Wasps Netball were an English netball team based at the Coventry Building Society Arena in Coventry, Warwickshire. Wasps Netball was formed in 2016 as a partnership with the Premiership Rugby team, Wasps RFC. Since 2017 their senior team has played in the Netball Superleague. They were Superleague champions in 2017 and 2018. The holding company for the team were placed in insolvency on 17 October 2022 and a new company called "Wasps Netball Limited" was incorporated with Companies House on 26 October 2022.

History

New franchise
In June 2016 it was announced that Wasps, together with Severn Stars and Scottish Sirens, would be one of three new franchises that would join the Netball Superleague for the 2017 season. Wasps subsequently appointed Tamsin Greenway as their first director of netball. Wasps Netball was formed as a partnership with the Premiership Rugby team, Wasps RFC. In December 2016 Wasps defeated Team Bath 22–15 to win the Mike Greenwood Trophy. In January 2017 Wasps also played in Team Bath's pre-season Tri-Tournament. On 21 February 2017 Wasps made their Superleague debut at the Emirates Arena with a 57–43 win against fellow newcomers Sirens. On 5 March 2017 Wasps made their home Superleague debut at the Ricoh Arena with a 51–47 win against Hertfordshire Mavericks.

Superleague champions
Wasps were Superleague champions in 2017 and 2018. In 2017, with a team that included Tamsin Greenway, Rachel Dunn, Bongiwe Msomi and Natalie Haythornthwaite, Wasps defeated Loughborough Lightning  55–51 in the grand final. In 2018 Wasps retained the Superleague title after again defeating Loughborough Lightning 55–51 in the grand final. The winning squad included  Greenway, Dunn, Haythornthwaite, Samantha May and Jade Clarke.

Demise
Wasps Netball were placed into administration on 17 October 2022 with all their playing and coaching staff made redundant.

On 10 November 2022, England Netball announced that Wasps Netball would no longer be eligible to compete in the Netball Super League moving forwards.

Senior finals

Netball Superleague Grand Finals
Between 2017 and 2019 Wasps have played in three successive Netball Superleague grand finals.

Fast5 Netball All-Stars Championship
Wasps have played in two British Fast5 Netball All-Stars Championship finals.

Home venue
Wasps play their home games in both the Indoor Arena - Coventry at the Coventry Building Society Arena and in the Sport and Wellness Hub at the University of Warwick. The team also train at the University of Warwick.

Notable players

2023 squad

Internationals

 Bongiwe Msomi
 Renske Stoltz

Head coaches

Honours
Netball Superleague
Winners: 2017, 2018: 2
Runners up: 2019: 1
British Fast5 Netball All-Stars Championship
Winners: 2018: 1
Runners up: 2019: 1
Mike Greenwood Trophy
Winners: 2017: 1

References

External links
 Wasps Netball on Facebook
  Wasps Netball on Twitter

 
Defunct netball teams in England
Sport in Coventry
Netball
Defunct Netball Superleague teams
Sports clubs established in 2016
2016 establishments in England
Sports clubs disestablished in 2022
2022 disestablishments in England